First Presbyterian Church is a historic Presbyterian church at Church St. in Valatie, Columbia County, New York.  It was built in 1878 and is a one-story, rectangular building built of face brick with limestone trim in the High Victorian Gothic style.  It features three very steep gable roofs surfaced with polychrome slate, dormer windows, a porte cochere, and an engaged brick tower capped by an open belfry.

It was listed on the National Register of Historic Places in 1979.

References

Presbyterian churches in New York (state)
Churches on the National Register of Historic Places in New York (state)
Churches completed in 1878
19th-century Presbyterian church buildings in the United States
Churches in Columbia County, New York
National Register of Historic Places in Columbia County, New York